Nqobisizwe Minentle 'Mox' Mxoli (born 2 February 1994) is a South African rugby union professional player for  in the Currie Cup. His regular position is prop.

Rugby career

Schoolboy rugby

Mxoli was born in Durban and went to Westville Boys' High School, but wasn't selected to represent KwaZulu-Natal in any school-level rugby union competitions.

Blue Bulls

After finishing school, Mxoli moved to Pretoria to join the Blue Bulls Academy. They eventually won the competition, beating the  35–23 in the final, but Nxoli didn't feature for them in the play-off stages.

That was his only appearance in the competition and he linked up with the South Africa Under-20 squad as they prepared for the 2014 IRB Junior World Championship in New Zealand. He was not named in the matchday squads for their first two pool stage matches against Scotland and New Zealand, but was included on the bench for their third match against Samoa. However, he failed to get any game time in the match as South Africa won 21–8 to qualify for the semi-finals. He was again not named in their squad that beat New Zealand in the semi-final or the squad that lost 20–21 to England in the final, therefore failing to play a single minute in the tournament.

Upon his return to domestic action, he played five times for the s in the round-robin stages of the 2014 Under-21 Provincial Championship. He scored a brace against  in a 123–7 victory to help the Blue Bulls qualify for the semi-finals, but didn't feature in the play-offs, as the Blue Bulls won the tournament, beating  20–10 in the final.

At the start of 2015, Mxoli represented university side  in the 2015 Varsity Cup. After the tournament, he was named as a replacement prop in a Varsity Cup Dream Team that played a match against the 2015 South African Under-20 squad, with the latter winning the match 31–24.

Mxoli took just 4 minutes to score his first senior try in the match to help the Blue Bulls to an 83–13 victory. He then reverted to the  side, making seven starts for them during the 2015 Under-21 Provincial Championship Group A and scoring tries in their matches against the Leopards and Western Province.

In 2016, Mxoli was included in the Blue Bulls squad for the 2016 Currie Cup qualification series.

In July 2016, the Blue Bulls confirmed that Mxoli failed a drugs test, after a dietary supplement that he used was found to contain a banned substance.

References

1994 births
Living people
Blue Bulls players
Bulls (rugby union) players
Cheetahs (rugby union) players
Doping cases in rugby union
Griquas (rugby union) players
Rugby union players from Durban
Rugby union props
South Africa Under-20 international rugby union players
South African rugby union players
Free State Cheetahs players
Griffons (rugby union) players